Albert Gustav Winterhalter (October 5, 1856 – June 5, 1920) was an admiral in the United States Navy. He was commander in chief of the U.S. Asiatic Fleet from 1915 to 1917.  He could speak or read eleven languages by the time he was appointed to command the Asiatic Fleet.

Biography
He was born in Detroit, Michigan, on October 5, 1856, to John Winterhalter. Winterhalter was appointed to the U.S. Naval Academy from the First Congressional District of Michigan, graduating in 1877.

Winterhalter lost an eye to an archery accident in 1877.

Winterhalter spent much of his career in scientific posts. He was assigned to the United States Naval Observatory from January 1885 to November 1889, during which time he served as the United States delegate to the International Astrophotographic Congress in Paris, France, and visited the principal observatories of Europe. His report on the tour was published in 1889. He was also responsible for the Naval Observatory Exhibit at the Chicago World's Fair in 1893.

While stationed in San Francisco in 1896, he married Broadway actress Helen Dauvray.

In 1898, as flag lieutenant to Rear Admiral J.M. Miller, Commander in Chief Pacific Station, Winterhalter personally arranged the hoisting of the American flag at the ceremonies attending the transfer of sovereignty of the Hawaiian Islands to the United States. He assumed command of the gunboat Elcano in 1902 and of the gunboat Paducah in 1905. As Aide for Material from 1914 to 1915, he was a principal assistant to the Secretary of the Navy and an ex-officio voting member of the General Board of the Navy. He took command of the U.S. Asiatic Fleet on July 11, 1915, and ranked as a full admiral for the duration of his tour, reverting to his permanent rank of rear admiral upon relinquishing command in 1917.

He was Hydrographer of the Navy from May 1908 to January 1910. In 1916, Winterhalter conducted experiments aboard USS Washington (ACR-11) to evaluate acoustic ranging techniques. He sailed Washington on different courses relative to a lightship that was transmitting radio waves and air- and water-mediated sound waves, and found that submarine sound waves were a more reliable guide than air-mediated sound. This was the first attempt to determine distance using acoustics, and a similar technique was later used for hydrographic surveys.

During World War I, Winterhalter served as a member of the General Board of the Navy in advising the Department upon many matters of great importance relating to the conduct of the war and was decorated with the Navy Distinguished Service Medal for his service.

He died of lobar pneumonia on June 5, 1920, in Washington, D.C., at the United States Naval Hospital. He was buried in Arlington National Cemetery. His widow died three years later.

Dates of rank
Cadet Midshipman – September 24, 1873
Midshipman – June 18, 1877
Ensign – July 10, 1880
Lieutenant (junior grade) – December 14, 1886
Lieutenant – June 30, 1892
Lieutenant Commander – unknown
Commander – July 1, 1905
Captain – 1909
Rear Admiral – 1915
Admiral – July 11, 1915

References

Further reading
Arlington National Cemetery

USS Elcano
Helen Dauvray
Burial location

1856 births
1920 deaths
United States Naval Academy alumni
United States Navy admirals
Military personnel from Detroit
Recipients of the Navy Distinguished Service Medal
Burials at Arlington National Cemetery
American expatriates in France